Japan Habba (Japan Festival) (Kannada: ಜಪಾನ್ ಹಬ್ಬ, Japanese: ジャパン　ハッバ) is a cultural exchange program between Indians and Japanese. Started as an annual event in 2005, it aims at showcasing Japanese culture to all students of Japanese language, and those interested in Japan and its culture under one platform. It has been celebrated in Bangalore during spring (January–February) of every year.

The word, "Japan Habba" was coined from two words, 'Japan' and 'Habba', where Habba refers to "Festival" in Kannada.

Being an international event, Japan Habba attracts huge audience from across country and from Japan. Japan Habba 2012 was registered for the celebrations of 60th anniversary of Japan-India diplomatic relations.

Purpose 
The sole purpose of Japan Habba is to facilitate, strengthen, and deepen the ties between the people of India and Japan, which is the foundation for relationships.

Program overview 
There are various programs that are part of Japan Habba:
 Karaoke contest
 Group Dance
 Group Song performance
 Comparison of Indian and Japanese culture through a small play

Apart from celebration programs, a lot of booths are open in Japan Habba:
 Japanese summer clothes (Yukata)
 Japanese tea ceremony (Ochakai)
 Japanese Calligraphy exhibition
 Live calligraphy experience
 Japanese paper folding exhibition (Origami)
 Kanji / Chinese character mehndi
 Japanese sweet candy
 Disposable chopsticks popper

Active organizations 
Japan Habba is celebrated under the auspices of below organizations.
 Japan Habba Trust
 Bangalore Japanese Consulate 
 Bangalore Japanese Association
 Japan Foundation
 Koyo 
 Indo-Japanese Chamber of Commerce and Industries

See also
 Japanese people in India

References

External links
 Japanese dance Bharatanatyam, sing in Kannada overseasindia.in, June 2009.
 
 

Culture of Bangalore
India–Japan relations
Festivals established in 2005
Cultural exchange
Japan in non-Japanese culture
Festivals in Karnataka
Bangalore University
Events in Bangalore